Andar Ab (also Romanized as Andar Āb) is a village in the Sabalan District of Sareyn County, Ardabil Province, Iran. At the 2006 census, its population was 337 in 77 families.

References 

Towns and villages in Sareyn County